Xero Shoes is a brand of lightweight minimalist footwear manufactured by Feel the World Inc. Designed for walking, running, and sports athletics. The shoes have thin and very flexible soles contoured and designed to fit the shape of the human foot. Xero Shoes was featured on ABC's Shark Tank and gained success after its appearance on the show.

History
Xero Shoes was founded by Steven Sashen, a Master All-American sprinter and former gymnast. After two years of injury-prone competition, he joined a local barefoot running club in Boulder, CO at the suggestion of a friend who gave him a copy of Born To Run by Christopher McDougall.  As a result of running barefoot, Sashen claimed that his gait improved and his injuries abated. There is a mix of research regarding the underlying mechanics that could drive such improvements. Many of these are summarized in a study by Fuller Et. Al. (2015), where they analyze the long-term effect of minimalist shoes on running performance and injury. The study was a randomized controlled trial. After a review of studies on the matter in 2014, there is a lack of high-quality evidence to enable definitive conclusions regarding specific risks or benefits to running barefoot or in minimalist shoes.".

Sashen wanted to continue the barefoot experience in areas that required foot covering, so he developed his own huarache-style sandal similar to those worn by the Tarahumara Indians in Mexico’s Copper Canyon, consisting of a thin rubber sole and nylon-polypropylene laces.

After making the first pair for his wife Lena Phoenix, and a second for himself, Sashen got requests from friends for their own minimalist sandals. Sashen then launched a website called Invisibleshoe.com, selling this DIY sandal kit in late November 2009.

In August 2012, the company engaged Dennis Driscoll, who has previously developed products for Avia, Crocs, Dr. Martens, and Wilson Sporting Goods, as a Chief Product Officer, and renamed the brand Xero Shoes in December 2012. It has since sold shoes and sandals in various styles and designs to customers in 94 countries.

In 2019, Xero Shoes was affected by the trade war tariff enacted by President Donald Trump. This tariff resulted in a 15% increase in costs due to the import tax from China.

The company has since moved from online sales only to also channel marketing via select high street-based North American retailers and Amazon.com.

In 2020, Xero Shoes expanded its product line to include flats and other casual footwear. Keeping with their minimalist design, the Xero Phoenix became one of their best-selling shoes.

On November 11, 2021, Xero Shoes expanded into Europe with a new direct-to-consumer website at https://xeroshoes.eu and operational headquarters located in Prague, CZ.

Reception 
In 2012, National Geographic named Xero Shoes as one of the top 5 best running shoe brands.

In 2017, Apparel Magazine nominated Xero Shoes as one of the top Apparel brands of 2017 amongst contenders like American Eagle, 3.1 Phillip Lim, and other brands.

In 2018 Business Insider acclaimed Xero Shoes as one of the Top 5 Best Barefoot shoes of 2018.

In 2020, Inc Magazine listed Xero Shoes in the Inc. 5000 as No. 1,305 for accomplishing a 343% 3 Year Growth. Xero Shoes also placed No. 818 in 2019, and No. 1753 in 2017.

January 14, 2022, Field & Stream Magazine listed the Daylite Hiker Fusion as the "Best Lightweight Hiking Boot"

See also
 Locomotor effects of shoes
 Barefoot running
 Minimalist shoe
 Vibram FiveFingers
 Vivobarefoot

References

External links
Biomechanics of Foot Strikes & Applications to Running Barefoot or in Minimal Footwear
Have Shoes Changed the Way We Run?

 Xero Shoes EU
 Xero Shoes US

Clothing companies established in 2009
Companies based in Boulder, Colorado
2009 establishments in Colorado
Athletic shoes
Athletic shoe brands
Shoe companies of the United States
Sporting goods manufacturers of the United States
Sportswear brands
Running
Minimalist clothing